Haina, which in the Haida language means "Sunshine Town", is a locality in the Haida Gwaii archipelago on the east side of Maude Island.  It is located on Krahna 4, also known as Krahna Indian Reserve No. 4,

See also
List of Haida villages

References

Unincorporated settlements in British Columbia
Haida villages